Dongs of Sevotion is the eighth studio album by Smog. It was released on April 3, 2000 in Europe by Domino Recording Company and a day later in North America by Drag City. It peaked at number 28 on the UK Independent Albums Chart.

Critical reception

At Metacritic, which assigns a weighted average score out of 100 to reviews from mainstream critics, the album received an average score of 85, based on 10 reviews, indicating "universal acclaim".

NME named it the 27th best album of 2000. Pitchfork placed it at number 10 on its list of the top 20 albums of 2000.

Track listing

Personnel
Credits adapted from liner notes.

 Bill Callahan – vocals, guitar, piano, hammond organ, synthesizer, jaw harp
 Jennifer Collins – backing vocals
 Nicole Evans – backing vocals
 Damian Rogers – backing vocals
 Jeff Parker – guitar
 Matt Lux – bass guitar, upright bass
 Richard Schuler – drums
 John McEntire – drums, percussion, recording, mixing
 Phil Bonnet – recording
 Joe Dilillo – recording
 John Towner – recording

Charts

References

External links
 

2000 albums
Bill Callahan (musician) albums
Drag City (record label) albums
Domino Recording Company albums